Alexis Massol González is a civil engineer and environmentalist from Puerto Rico. He graduated in civil engineering in  University of Puerto Rico at Mayagüez in 1965 and was awarded the Goldman Environmental Prize in 2002 for his efforts on the protection of Puerto Rico's mountain forests due to threats from mining interests. In 1980 he and his wife Tinti Deyá Díaz established Casa Pueblo, a non-profit environmental watchdog community-based organization in Adjuntas. One of the organization's achievements was protecting the forest surrounding their town by establishing Bosque del Pueblo in 1996. It was the first community-managed forest in Puerto Rico. A book he authored, Casa Pueblo: A Puerto Rican Model of Self-Governance, published in 2022, "offers a chronological account of Casa Pueblo’s evolution from a small group of concerned citizens to an internationally recognized model for activism."

References

forestry in Puerto Rico
Goldman Environmental Prize awardees
living people
people from Adjuntas, Puerto Rico
Puerto Rican civil engineers
Puerto Rican environmentalists
year of birth missing (living people)